Howraghat Assembly constituency is one of the 126 constituencies of the Assam Legislative Assembly in India. Howraghat forms a part of the Autonomous District Lok Sabha constituency. This seat is reserved for the Scheduled Tribes (ST).

Members of Legislative Assembly 
 1967: C. S. Teron, Indian National Congress
 1972: C. S. Teron, Indian National Congress
 1978: Barelong Terang, Janata Party
 1983: Dorsing Terang, Indian National Congress
 1985: Khorsing Engti, Independent
 1991: Babu Rongpi, Autonomous State Demand Committee
 1996: Chandrakanta Terang, Autonomous State Demand Committee
 2001: Dharamsing Teron, Autonomous State Demand Committee (United)
 2006: Khorsing Engti, Indian National Congress
 2011: Khorsing Engti, Indian National Congress
 2016: Joyram Engleng, Bharatiya Janata Party
 2021: Dorsing Ronghang, Bharatiya Janata Party

Election results

2016 results

2011 result

See also
 Howraghat
 Autonomous District Lok Sabha constituency
 Karbi Anglong district

External links 
 

Assembly constituencies of Assam